Singing Ringing Tree can refer to:

 The Singing Ringing Tree (Das singende, klingende Bäumchen) a 1957 German children's fantasy film
 Singing Ringing Tree (sculpture), a musical sculpture in England